Mariano Ciai (16 February 1893 – 16 February 1958) was an Italian wrestler. He competed in the featherweight event at the 1912 Summer Olympics.

References

1893 births
1958 deaths
Olympic wrestlers of Italy
Wrestlers at the 1912 Summer Olympics
Italian male sport wrestlers
Sportspeople from Rome